North Korea–Switzerland relations are foreign relations between North Korea and Switzerland. Switzerland has a cooperation office in the Taedonggang River District of Pyongyang, North Korea, while official diplomatic duties are performed by the Swiss embassy in Beijing, China. North Korea maintains an embassy in Bern.

History
Switzerland was a member of the Neutral Nations Supervisory Commission in the Korean Demilitarized Zone (DMZ) upon the end of the Korean War. The two countries have had diplomatic relations since 1974. Additionally, Switzerland has long been a mediator party in talks between the involved parties of the conflict in the Korean peninsula (North Korea, South Korea, China, Japan, Russia, and the United States) most recently with the 2017–18 North Korea crisis. Swiss President Doris Leuthard identified her country as being able to host such talks again in September 2017.

North Korea's current leader, Kim Jong-un, is believed to have attended boarding school at the Liebefeld-Steinhölzli school in the late 1990s, having been registered under a pseudonym.

References 

 
Switzerland
Bilateral relations of Switzerland